The Cabinet of Ecuador, officially: Cabinet of the Citizens Revolution, is part of the executive branch of the Ecuadorian government, consisting of the heads of the variable number of government ministries. The cabinet is appointed by the President.

Current Ministers of the Cabinet

References

Government of Ecuador
Politics of Ecuador
Ecuador, Cabinet